Tamar Halpern is a writer and director living in Los Angeles. She holds an M.F.A. degree from the University of Southern California's School of Cinematic Arts.

Career

Tamar Halpern is a writer and director of ten feature films, including the documentary Llyn Foulkes One Man Band, co-directed with Chris Quilty. Halpern met Foulkes when they were neighbors in Los Angeles, and after becoming friends she cast him in her previous feature film Your Name Here.  Llyn Foulkes One Man Band screened in competition at L.A. Film Festival, had an Oscar qualifying theatrical run, and aired on Netflix  for two years before going to Amazon Prime. 

Shot over seven years as Foulkes struggles to find acknowledgement in the international art world, The Hollywood Reporter said, "Foulkes is a joy to watch", and Variety compared the film to Searching for Sugar Man and Cutie and the Boxer. With commentary by Dennis Hopper, Johnny Carson, Paul Schimmel and George Herms, the documentary chronicles the execution of two Foulkes paintings The Lost Frontier (1997-2004) and Deliverance (2004-2007).  The film also features extended interviews and musical performances of Foulkes' one-man band contraption called "The Machine".

Previous work includes Jeremy Fink and the Meaning of Life which Halpern adapted from the children's book of the same name by Wendy Mass, starring Mira Sorvino, Joe Pantoliano, Ryan Simpkins, and Michael Urie, with music by Edie Brickell and Sing-Sing.  Halpern's feature Shelf Life starred Betsy Brandt of Breaking Bad and was called a "whip-smart film that taps into a fresh source for American comedy" by Variety.  Halpern's short comedy Death, Taxes and Apple Juice was invited to 40+ festivals, winning 16 awards including Boston Women in Comedy  and L.A. Short Film Festival. Halpern has written and directed five features for Lifetime Network.

Halpern sold her first novel to Diogenes Press in Zurich, which will release in 2023. Called RAD, it's about a teen girl living in the San Fernando Valley and the Bay Area in the 1980’s. Halpern's short story, "The House Where the Grifters Squat," was written during a funded writing residency at Hedgebrook,  and was first published in Joyland before winning the Sundress Publications' Best of the Net Award.  Halpern is also a contributor to the Huffington Post.

A nominated Film Expert for American Film Showcase and the US Dept. of Education, Halpern has taught directing, screenwriting and documentary filmmaking in Amman, Jordan to locals as well as Syrian refugees and is a visiting screenwriting professor at USC.  She has written and directed commercials and digital campaigns for Amazon, DPS, Visa, EventBrite, Pepsi, YSL and Armani, among others, has a background in interactive multimedia and is a founder of the internet startup CitySearch.  She holds a BA in Broadcast Journalism and an MFA in Film Production, both from USC.  Her son is the composer 
Jordan Halpern Schwartz  and her mother is the artist Abigail Gumbiner.

Personal life
Halpern is Jewish, and her grandfather was a rabbi who marched with Martin Luther King, Jr. and was arrested twice for marching.

References

External links
 
  Tamaroland Pictures Website
 Film New Europe:  Production Missing In Europe Wraps Production in Serbia
 Look What She Did:  Tamar Halpern on Nellie Bly
 LA Times:  L.A. Film Fest: Llyn Foulkes: One Man Band goes inside the artists' studio
 LA Times: Maverick Llyn Foulkes is finally inside the art world — at age 79
  American Film Showcase:  Tamar Halpern bio
 New York Times review:  Llyn Foulkes One Man Band, A Documentary
 Film Independent:  10 Questions with Tamar Halpern and Chris Quilty of Llyn Foulkes One Man Band
 Moveablefest:  Tamar Halpern and Chris Quilty on Orchestrating Llyn Foulkes One Man Band
 VIMOOZ: Interview with Tamar Halpern and Chris Quilty, Documentary Llyn Foulkes One Man Band to Premiere at LA Film Festival
 USC News Film Review:  Documentary Profiles Consistently Inconsistent Llyn Foulkes
 Offramp:  Artist Llyn Foulkes Once Neglected Young Turk Star
 Los Angeles Magazine: Mickey Mouse, Dead Cats, and One Man Bands:  The Llyn Foulkes Documentary
 Filmleaf review:  Llyn Foulkes One Man Band (Tamar Halpern, Chris Quilty, 2013)
 Artnews:  Thats All, Foulkes
 BBC culture story:  Llyn Foulkes:  The art world's one-man-band
 Port Townsend Film Festival - Women & Film Current Program, Tamar Halpern bio
 Voyage L.A. Interview:  Meet Tamar Halpern of Tamaroland Pictures in Eastside
 Film Threat Review: Jeremy Fink and the Meaning of Life
 Director Tamar Halpern with Actress Mira Sorvino at NYC Premiere of Jeremy Fink and the Meaning of Life
 New England Film:  An Interview with Filmmaker Tamar Halpern
 Correatown: Music video directed by Tamar Halpern
 Movie Magg Film Review:  My Daughter Is Missing
 Deuxiéme Page:  Interview with Tamar Halpern
 Comediva interview
 

21st-century American women
American women short story writers
American short story writers
American Jews
Film directors from Los Angeles
Living people
Writers from Los Angeles
USC School of Cinematic Arts alumni
Year of birth missing (living people)